Ichnos is an album by English musician Tony Oxley. Released in 1971 by RCA Victor, it features Oxley on percussion, Evan Parker on saxophone, Kenny Wheeler on trumpet and flugelhorn, Paul Rutherford on trombone, Derek Bailey on electric guitar, and Barry Guy on double bass. The musicians are heard in varying combinations: two sextets, two quartets, and a percussion solo.

Reception

In a review for Paris Transatlantic, Graham L. Rogers wrote: "This is powerful work from a time and place when free improvisation was in its youth and talented musicians with uncluttered heads took risks and disregarded rules, creating the spontaneous, imaginative music which came to define the genre."

Author Ben Watson stated: "By seizing the timbral serialism of Webern and performing it with the expressive velocity of jazz, Oxley's group heralded almost everything new in music for the next three decades... It revives Edgard Varèse's project of a music that would organise itself according to the dictates of timbre and the impact of noise rather than overarching systems of harmony and rhythm." He concluded: "It makes all previous music sound grey."

The editors of Mats Gustafsson's Discaholic called the recording a "free music monster. Monumental, intricate, detailed and balanced music and just a classic
album of the highest beauty!" They commented: "The solo excursions on this album are magic beyond words... this is as good as it gets. Highest possible recommendations!"

Track listing
Composed by Tony Oxley. Track timings not provided.

 "Crossing" (sextet)
 "Oryane" (percussion solo)
 "Eiroc" (quartet)
 "Santrel" (quartet)
 "Cadilla" (sextet)

Personnel 
 Tony Oxley – drums, percussion
 Evan Parker – soprano saxophone, tenor saxophone
 Kenny Wheeler – trumpet, flugelhorn
 Paul Rutherford – trombone
 Derek Bailey – electric guitar
 Barry Guy – double bass

References

1971 albums
Tony Oxley albums
RCA Victor albums
Free jazz albums